Ertuğrul Arslan (born 26 January 1980) is a Turkish retired professional footballer who currently serves as the manager of Kemerspor 2003.

Career
On 22 July 2012, Balıkesirspor signed Arslan on a two-year contract.

References

External links
 Guardian Stats Centre
 

1980 births
Living people
Turkish footballers
Süper Lig players
Kayserispor footballers
Kayseri Erciyesspor footballers
Sivasspor footballers
Bursaspor footballers
Elazığspor footballers
Antalyaspor footballers
Konyaspor footballers
Balıkesirspor footballers
TFF First League players
Association football midfielders